The 2018–19 First Division is the 29th season of Norway's second highest ice hockey league, First Division.

The regular season began play on September 22, 2018, and will be concluded on March 3, 2019.

The promotional and relegation playoffs began in March 2019.

Participating teams

Team changes
 Kongsvinger Knights was relegated through the 2017-18 promotional playoffs. Ringerike Panthers was promoted.
Kongsvinger Knights went bankrupt midway through the season, on December 18, 2018.

Regular season

Standings
Updated as of March 3, 2019.
x – clinched promotional playoff spot; y – clinched regular season league title; r – play in relegation series

Source: hockey.no

Playoffs

Promotional Playoffs

After the regular season ends, the lowest ranked team in the 2018–19 GET-ligaen and the two highest ranked teams in the First Division will compete for the right to play in the 2019–20 GET-ligaen. The tournament will be organized according to a double round robin format, where each club plays the others twice, home and away, for a total of four games. The points system and ranking method used, is the same as in the regular season.

Relegational Playoffs

After the regular season ended, the lowest ranked team in the First Division and the two highest ranked teams in the Second Division should have competed for the right to play in the  2019–20 Norwegian First Division. However, due to the bankruptcy of Kongsvinger Knights, and the announcement of Storhamar Yngres to withdraw from the 2019-20 season, the spots were offered to the two best Second Division teams, Lørenskog and Haugesund Seagulls.

References

External links
  

Norw
First Division
Norwegian First Division (ice hockey) seasons